Żyła is a Polish-language surname. It may refer to:
 Andrzej Żyła (born 1946), Polish luger
 Piotr Żyła (born 1987), Polish ski jumper
 Tomasz Żyła (born 1967), Polish bobsledder

See also
 

Polish-language surnames